Pelican Narrows Water Aerodrome  is located adjacent to Pelican Narrows, Saskatchewan, Canada.

See also 
 List of airports in Saskatchewan
 Pelican Narrows Airport

References 

Registered aerodromes in Saskatchewan
Seaplane bases in Saskatchewan